Michael Richard Wade, commonly known as Mike Wade (born 13 September 1937, in Leicester) was a rugby union centre who played 166 games for Leicester Tigers between 1955 and 1967; he represented England 3 times in 1962.  He was a Cambridge University blue captaining the side to victory in 1961.

Wade made his Tigers debut against Bedford on Christmas Eve 1955 as an 18-year-old whilst still at school, playing 3 games in four days during the club's Christmas festival also featuring against Birkenhead Park and the Barbarians. He then dropped out of the side until the end of the season where he played 3 of the final four games.

He was captain of the Cambridge University rugby team in their undefeated 1961 season winning 14 games including the Varsity Match. Wade was then capped three times for England in the 1962 Five Nations, making his debut against Wales he also featured against Ireland and France but was dropped for the Calcutta Cup match against Scotland, his clubmate at Leicester Horrocks-Taylor taking his place.

Wade was Tigers captain in 1963/64 and again in 1964/65 however he suffered an injury to his knee cartilage in a game against Richmond in November 1965.  Effectively forcing him to retire he played only 3 more games for the club in January and February in 1967.

References

1937 births
Living people
England international rugby union players
English rugby union players
Leicester Tigers players
Rugby union centres
Cambridge University R.U.F.C. players
Rugby union players from Leicester
People educated at Wyggeston Grammar School for Boys